Dermatocarpon moulinsii is a species of saxicolous (rock-dwelling), foliose lichen in the family Verrucariaceae. It is distinguished from other members of Dermatocarpon by the presence of rhizines on its underside. In North America, it occurs as mainly a western montane species.

The lichen was originally described by Camille Montagne in 1843 as a species of Endocarpon. It is named after French naturalist Charles des Moulins, who collected the type specimen in France. Alexander Zahlbruckner transferred it to Dermatocarpon in 1903.

References

Verrucariales
Lichens described in 1843
Lichen species
Lichens of Europe
Lichens of North America
Taxa named by Camille Montagne